Grace Chan (born 23 June 1991) is a Hong Kong-born Canadian actress, television host, and beauty pageant titleholder. She was the winner of Miss Hong Kong 2013 and Miss Chinese International 2014.

Early life
Grace Chan was born in Hong Kong and immigrated to Vancouver, British Columbia with her family at the age of 5. She has a fraternal twin brother and an older sister. Through her maternal grandmother, Chan is of Malay descent. She graduated from Simon Fraser University with a major in Communications and a minor in Publishing.

Career

Miss Hong Kong 2013
Chan was crowned Miss Hong Kong on 1 September 2013. From the beginning of the pageant, she expressed that it was her childhood dream to enter the Miss Hong Kong Pageant. As an early favourite, Chan beat the other nine contestants by gaining a majority of the 170,000 votes that were cast from the Hong Kong audience. She also won the Tourism Ambassador, Most Popular among Media and Most Popular Pageant on Scene awards. After completing her university studies, Chan immediately returned to Hong Kong for the pageant, sacrificing her graduation ceremony in Vancouver.

Miss Chinese International 2014
Organizers this year decided to change the formula of the competition and introduced an elimination round after nearly every segment.

Not only did Chan represent herself in the pageant, she is also the 3rd representative from Hong Kong to have held both titles, the last title belonging to Sonija Kwok 14 years ago. She defeated the hottest favourite contestant Cindy Zhong, who is from Vancouver and became the winner of Miss Chinese International 2014.

Acting career
After being crowned Miss Hong Kong, Chan signed a manager contract with TVB. She made her acting debut in the 2014 drama Overachievers. Chan took on her first female leading role in the 2015 dramas Raising the Bar and Captain of Destiny. She won the Best New TVB Artiste award at the 2015 StarHub TVB Awards as well as the Most Improved Female Artiste award at the 2015 TVB Anniversary Awards.

Chan had not filmed any television dramas after guest starring in the drama Justice Bao: The First Year.

Personal life
On 26 July 2018, Chan announced via Instagram that she was engaged to her boyfriend of three years, Hong Kong actor, Kevin Cheng. On 12 August 2018, they got married in Bali, Indonesia. In February 2019, Chan announced on Instagram that she gave birth to their first son. She gave birth to their second son in July 2020. In November 2022, she announced that she is pregnant with her third baby on her personal Instagram account.

Filmography

Television dramas (TVB)

Television dramas (Shaw Brothers Pictures)

Films 
 Laundry Shop Stars Event (2016)
 Keyboard Warriors (2018)

Sources:

References

External links
 Grace Chan's official TVB page
 Grace Chan's Instagram

1991 births
Living people
Actresses from Vancouver
Hong Kong emigrants to Canada
Hong Kong film actresses
Miss Hong Kong winners
Simon Fraser University alumni